Thunnus (Thunnus) is a subgenus of ray-finned bony fishes in the Thunnini, or tuna, tribe.  More specifically, Thunnus (Thunnus) is a subgenus of the genus Thunnus, also known as the "true tunas".  Thunnus (Thunnus) is sometimes referred to as the bluefin group and comprises five species:

subgenus Thunnus (Thunnus)
 T. alalunga (Bonnaterre, 1788) – albacore
 T. maccoyii (Castelnau, 1872) – southern bluefin tuna
 T. obesus (Lowe, 1839) – bigeye tuna
 T. orientalis (Temminck and Schlegel, 1844) – Pacific bluefin tuna
 T. thynnus (Linnaeus, 1758) – Atlantic bluefin tuna

{| class="wikitable"
|-
! style="background-color: #D7F0FF; color:black;" colspan="9"| Thunnus (Thunnus) – the bluefin group of tunas
|-
! style="width:12em" | Common name
! style="width:12em" | Scientific name
! Maximumlength
! Commonlength
! Maximumweight
! Maximumage
! Trophiclevel
! Source
! style="width:13em" |IUCN status
|-
| Albacore
| T. alalunga(Bonnaterre, 1788)
| style="text-align:right;"| 
| style="text-align:right;"| 
| style="text-align:right;"| 
| style="text-align:right;"| 9–13 yrs
| style="text-align:center;"| 4.31
| style="text-align:center;"| 
|  Least Concern
|-
| Southern bluefin tuna
| T. maccoyii(Castelnau, 1872)
| style="text-align:right;"| 
| style="text-align:right;"| 
| style="text-align:right;"| 
| style="text-align:right;"| 20–40 yrs
| style="text-align:center;"| 3.93
| style="text-align:center;"| 
|  Endangered
|-
| Bigeye tuna
| T. obesus(Lowe, 1839)
| style="text-align:right;"| 
| style="text-align:right;"| 
| style="text-align:right;"| 
| style="text-align:right;"| 5–16 yrs
| style="text-align:center;"| 4.49
| style="text-align:center;"| 
|  Vulnerable
|-
| Pacific bluefin tuna
| T. orientalis(Temminck & Schlegel, 1844)
| style="text-align:right;"| 
| style="text-align:right;"| 
| style="text-align:right;"| 
| style="text-align:right;"| 15–26 yrs
| style="text-align:center;"| 4.21
| style="text-align:center;"| 
|  Near Threatened
|-
| Atlantic bluefin tuna
| T. thynnus(Linnaeus, 1758)
| style="text-align:right;"| 
| style="text-align:right;"| 
| style="text-align:right;"| 
| style="text-align:right;"| 35–50 yrs
| style="text-align:center;"| 4.43
| style="text-align:center;"| 
|  Least Concern
|}

References

Thunnus
Commercial fish
Sport fish
Taxa described in 1845
Animal subgenera